Lienen is a municipality in the district of Steinfurt, in North Rhine-Westphalia, Germany. It is situated approximately 15 km south-east of Osnabrück and 30 km north-east of Münster.

Lienen is a sister city with Saint Marys, Ohio in the United States. Lienen's neighboring municipalities, Ladbergen and Lengerich, are sister cities with Saint Marys' neighbors New Knoxville and Wapakoneta, respectively.

References

Steinfurt (district)